The Poughkeepsie School Building is a historic school building in Poughkeepsie, Arkansas, between Arkansas Highway 58 and Cherry Street.  It is a single-story fieldstone building in the shape of an H, with front-gabled wings flanking a central horizontally-ridged section.  The school was built in 1929–30, and is a well-preserved representative of a rural Arkansas stone school of the period.

The building was listed on the National Register of Historic Places in 1992, at which time it was still in use as a school.

See also
National Register of Historic Places listings in Sharp County, Arkansas

References

School buildings on the National Register of Historic Places in Arkansas
Buildings and structures in Sharp County, Arkansas
National Register of Historic Places in Sharp County, Arkansas
School buildings completed in 1930
1930 establishments in Arkansas